Zinc finger protein 280D, also known as Suppressor Of Hairy Wing Homolog 4, SUWH4, Zinc Finger Protein 634, ZNF634, or KIAA1584, is a protein that in humans is encoded by the ZNF280D gene located on chromosome 15q21.3.

Gene
There are a total of 24 possible exons in any variant of the ZNF280D gene.  ZNF280D is oriented on the minus strand of Chromosome 15 and spans 288.396 kb.
Surrounding genes at the same locus include TEX9, HMGB1P33, MNS1, LOC645877, and LOC145783.

mRNA
At least 24 spliced variants have been identified.   There are 7 probable alternative promoters.  The mRNAs appear to differ by truncation of the 5' end, truncation of the 3' end, presence or absence of 12 cassette exons, overlapping exons with different boundaries, splicing versus retention of 5 introns. The longest splice form contains 4428 bp.

Protein

Composition and Domains

The ZNF280D protein is 979 amino acids in length.
The protein contains a domain of unknown function (DUF4195) spanning from amino acid 45 to amino acid 230.
DUF4195 (pfam13826) is a family that is found at the N-terminus of metazoan proteins that carry PHD-like zinc-finger domains; the function is unknown.
ZNF280D protein also contains five highly conserved Cys2His2-type zinc finger domains.
Zinc fingers have the ability to bind DNA, which supports the speculative role of ZNF280D as a transcription factor.
The protein has a weight of approximately 109.3 kdal.
Charge cluster analysis reveals a negative charge cluster near the N-terminus from amino acids 16-43.
Charge clusters are associated with functional domains of cellular transcription factors, providing further support for ZNF280D as a possible transcription factor.

Interactions 

ZNF280D has been experimentally determined to interact with CBX5 and CBX3 proteins.
These proteins both play a role in the formation of heterochromatin, which presents a possible functional role of ZNF280D as a transcriptional repressor.

SNPs
There are a number of SNPs that have been observed in the human population.   The image below lists some of the most frequently occurring.

Regulation

mRNA Level

A number of transcription factors are predicted to bind to the predicted promoter region.

Protein Level
ZNF280D protein contains 66 serine, 17 threonine, and 6 tyrosine residues all of which are potential phosphorylation sites.

The glycine residue at position 2 is a probable candidate for N-terminal acetylation.
There are seven probable sumoylation sites.

Expression

ZNF280D is ubiquitously expressed at relatively low levels throughout almost all tissues in the human body.

In one study, the expression of ZNF280D was compared between endothelial progenitor cells in cord blood and peripheral blood.  The results show that expression was significantly higher in cord blood.  This supports a possible involvement of ZNF280D in embryonic development or cell differentiation.

Evolution
A number of orthologs and distant homologs have been identified for the human ZNF280D protein.  There are also four paralogs to ZNF280D in the human genome.

References

Further reading